Diamantina lombardii is a species of flowering plant in the Podostemaceae and the only known member of the genus Diamantina. It was described in 2004.

References

Podostemaceae
Plants described in 2004
Flora of Brazil